Minuscule 327 (in the Gregory-Aland numbering), O36 (Soden), is a Greek minuscule manuscript of the New Testament, on parchment. Paleographically it has been assigned to the 13th century. 
Formerly it was labelled by 37a and 43p.

Description 

The codex contains the text of the Acts, Catholic epistles, and Paul on 298 parchment leaves with lacunae (Hebrews 13:21-25). The text is written in one column per page, in 20 lines per page. The order of books: Acts, James, Jude, 1-2 Peter, 1-3 John, Pauline epistles.

The text of Hebrews 13:21-25 was supplied by a later hand.

Text 

The Greek text of the codex is a representative of the Byzantine text-type. Aland assigned it to the Category V.

History 

The manuscript was used by Walton in his Polyglot, and by Mill in his Novum Testamentum (as N. 2). Walton erroneously described it, and after him by Wettstein, as a part of the codex 58, which is a much later manuscript. It was examined by Dobbin. 
C. R. Gregory saw it in 1883.

Formerly it was labelled by 37a and 43p. In 1908 Gregory gave the number 327 to it.

The manuscript is currently housed at the New College (59) at Oxford.

See also 

 List of New Testament minuscules
 Biblical manuscript
 Textual criticism

References

Further reading 

 

Greek New Testament minuscules
13th-century biblical manuscripts